Milinda Jayasinghe (born 1978) is a former Sri Lankan rugby union player domiciled in New Zealand. He played for Sri Lanka in the Rugby Sevens tournament at the 2002 Asian Games.

Career 
Jayasinghe pursued his primary and secondary education at  Nalanda College, Colombo. He played for Nalanda Rugby team from 1994 to 1998. After leaving school he represented CR & FC, CH & FC and Sri Lanka Air Force. He moved to New Zealand where he became a provincial rugby coach.

See also 
 Rugby union in Sri Lanka

References

External links
 CH create upset - beat CR 17/8
 Janashakthi powers our flying heroes - Sri Lanka Air Force Rugby Team
 Sri Lankan Society hosts Invercargill's first Vesak celebration

1978 births
Living people
Sri Lankan rugby union players
Sri Lankan rugby sevens players
Rugby union players at the 2002 Asian Games
Asian Games competitors for Sri Lanka
Alumni of Nalanda College, Colombo